This is a list of private schools in Texas. Boarding schools are shown in bold.

A 
 AESA Prep Academy in Austin, Texas (K-12)
 Al-Hadi School of Accelerative Learning in Houston, Texas (K-12)
 Alcuin School in Dallas, Texas (PK-12)
All Saints' Catholic School (Dallas) in Dallas, Texas (K-8)
All Saints' Catholic School (Fort Worth) in Fort Worth, Texas (K-8)
 All Saints' Episcopal School in Beaumont, Texas (PK-8)
 All Saints' Episcopal School in Fort Worth, Texas (PK-12)
 All Saints Episcopal School (Lubbock, Texas) (PK-12)
 All Saints Episcopal School (Tyler, Texas) (PK-12)
 Allen Academy in Bryan, Texas (PK-12)
 American Heritage Academy in Rosenberg, Texas (PK-6)
 Antonian College Preparatory High School in Castle Hills, Texas (9-12)
 Archway Academy in Houston, Texas (9-12)
Assumption Catholic School in Houston, Texas (K-8)
 Austin Peace Academy in Austin, Texas (PK-12)
 Awty International School in Houston, Texas (PK-12)

B 
 Bay Area Christian School in League City, Texas (K-12)
 Baytown Christian Academy in Baytown, Texas (PK-12)
 Bethesda Christian School in Fort Worth, Texas (K-12)
 Beth Yeshurun Day School in Houston, Texas (PK-5)
 Bishop Dunne Catholic School in Dallas, Texas (6-12)
Bishop Lynch High School in Dallas, Texas (9-12)
Bishop Gorman Regional Catholic High School in Tyler, Texas (6-12)
Blessed Sacrament Catholic School in San Antonio, Texas (K-8)
 Brazos Christian School in Bryan, Texas (PK-12)
 Brentwood Christian School in Austin, Texas (PK-12)
 The Briarwood School in Houston, Texas (K-12)
 Brighter Horizons Academy in Garland, Texas (PK-12)
 Brook Hill School in Bullard, Texas (PK-12)

C 

 The Cambridge School of Dallas in Dallas, Texas (5-12)
Cassata Catholic High School in Fort Worth, Texas (9-12)
 Cathedral High School in El Paso, Texas (9-12)
 Cathedral School of St. Mary in Austin, Texas (K-8)
 Central Catholic Marianist High School in San Antonio, Texas (9-12)
 Challenger School Avery Ranch in Austin, Texas (PK-8)
 The Chinquapin School in Highlands, Texas (serves students from Houston, Texas) (6-12)
 Christ Academy in Wichita Falls, Texas (PK-12)
 Christ the King Catholic School in Dallas, Texas (K-8)
Christ the Redeemer Catholic School in Cypress, Texas (K-8)
 Christian Heritage School in Tyler, Texas (K-12)
 Cistercian Preparatory School in Irving, Texas (5-12)
 City School Austin in Austin, Texas (PK-8)
 The Clariden School in Southlake, Texas (PK-12)
Collins Catholic School in Corsicana, Texas (K-8)
 Cunae International School in The Woodlands, Texas (PK-12)
 Concordia Lutheran High School (Texas) in Tomball, Texas (9-12)
 Coram Deo Academy in Dallas, Texas (PK-12)
 Cornerstone Christian Academy in Granbury, Texas (PK-12)
 Cornerstone Christian School in San Antonio, Texas (PK-12)
Corpus Christi Catholic School in Houston, Texas (K-8)
 Covenant Academy in Cypress, Texas (PK-12)
 Covenant Christian Academy (Colleyville, Texas) (PK-12)
 Covenant Christian School (Conroe, Texas) in Conroe, Texas (PK-12)
 Covenant Classical School in Fort Worth, Texas (K-12)
 Covenant School of Dallas in Dallas, Texas (K-12)
The Covenant Preparatory School in Houston, Texas (PK-12)
 Cristo Rey Dallas College Prep (9-12)
Cristo Rey Fort Worth College Prep (9-12)
 Cristo Rey Jesuit College Preparatory of Houston (9-12)
 Cypress Christian School in Cypress, Texas (K-12)

D 
 Dallas International School (PK-12)
 Desoto Private School in Desoto, Texas (PK-6)
Duchesne Academy of the Sacred Heart in Houston, Texas (K-12)

E 
Eagle Christian Academy in Waco, Texas (PK-12)
 The Emery/Weiner School in Houston, Texas (6-12)
Epiphany of Our Lord Catholic School in Greater Katy (K-8)
 Episcopal School of Dallas in Dallas, Texas (PK-12)
 Episcopal High School in Bellaire, Texas (9-12)
 Explorations Preparatory School in Flower Mound, Texas (PK-6)
 E. A. Young Academy in North Richland Hills, Texas (K-12)

F 
 Fairhill School in Dallas, Texas (1-12)
Faith Lutheran School in Plano, Texas (PK-12)
Father Yermo Schools in El Paso, Texas (PK-12)
 Fort Worth Country Day School in Fort Worth, Texas (PK-12)
 Fort Bend Christian Academy (PK-12)
 Fort Worth Christian School in Fort Worth, Texas (PK-12)
Frassati Catholic High School in Spring, Texas (9-12)

G 
 Garland Christian Academy in Garland, Texas (PK-12)
 Geneva School of Boerne in Boerne, Texas (K-12)
Good Shepherd Catholic School in Garland, Texas (K-8)
 Grace Preparatory Academy (K-12)
 Great Oak School in Tomball, TX (PK-8)
 Greenhill School (Addison, Texas) (PK-12)
 Grapevine Faith Christian School in Grapevine, Texas (PK-12)
 Grace Community School in Tyler, Texas (PK-12)

H 
 Harvest Time Christian Academy in Tyler, Texas (PK-12)
 Headwaters School in Austin, Texas (PK-12)
 The Highlands School in Irving (PK-12)
 The Hockaday School in Dallas, Texas (PK-12)
 Holy Cross of San Antonio (6-12)
Holy Family Catholic Academy in Irving, Texas (K-8)
 Holy Family Catholic School (Austin) (K-8)
Holy Family Catholic School (Dallas) (K-8)
Holy Family Catholic School (Galveston) (K-8)
Holy Family Catholic School (Fort Worth) in Fort Worth, Texas (K-8)
Holy Ghost Catholic School in Houston, Texas (K-8)
Holy Name Catholic School in San Antonio, Texas (K-8)
Holy Rosary Catholic School (Galveston (K-8)
Holy Rosary Catholic School (Rosenberg) (K-8)
Holy Spirit Catholic School in San Antonio, Texas (K-8)
 Holy Trinity Catholic High School in Temple, Texas (9-12)
Holy Trinity Catholic School in Grapevine, Texas (K-8)
 Houston Christian High School in Houston, Texas (9-12)
 Hyde Park Schools in Austin, Texas (K-12)

I 
IANT Quranic Academy in Richardson, Texas (PK-12)
Iman Academy in Houston, Texas (PK-12)
Immaculate Conception Catholic School (Grand Prairie) in Grand Prairie (K-8)
Immaculate Conception Catholic School (Fort Worth) in Fort Worth, Texas (K-8)
 Incarnate Word Academy (Houston) (9-12)
 Incarnate Word High School (San Antonio, Texas)  (9-12)
 Islamic Education Institute of Texas in Houston, Texas (PK-12)
 Islamic School of Irving (PK-12)

J 
 Jesuit College Preparatory School in Dallas, Texas (9-12)
 John Cooper School in The Woodlands, Texas (PK-12)
 John Paul II Catholic High School (Schertz, Texas) (9-12)
 John Paul II Catholic School (Houston) (K-8)
 John Paul II High School (Plano, Texas) (9-12)
 June Shelton School in Dallas, Texas (PK-12)

K 
 Kaufman Christian School in Kaufman, Texas (PK-8)
 Keene Adventist Elementary School in Keene, Texas (PK-8)
 Keystone School in San Antonio, Texas (PK-12)
King's Academy Christian School in Tyler, Texas (K-12)
Kingdom Collegiate Academies in Dallas (PK-12)
 Kinkaid School in Houston, Texas (PK-12)
 Kirby Hall School in Austin, Texas (PK-12)

L 
 Lakehill Preparatory School in Dallas, Texas (K-12)
 Legacy Classical Christian Academy in Haslet, Texas (PK-12)
 Legacy Christian Academy (Beaumont, Texas) (PK-12)
 Legacy Christian Academy (Frisco, Texas) (PK-12)
 Liberty Christian School (Argyle, Texas) (PK-12)
 Lifegate Christian School in Seguin, Texas (K-12)
Little Flower Catholic School in San Antonio, Texas (K-8)
 Live Oak Classical School in Waco, Texas (PK-12)
Loretto Academy (El Paso, Texas) (K-12)
 Lucas Christian Academy in Lucas, Texas  (PK-12)
 Lutheran High School of San Antonio (9-12)

M 
 Marine Military Academy in Harlingen, Texas (7-12)
Mary Immaculate Catholic School in Farmers Branch, Texas (K-8)
 Mirus Academy in Katy, Texas (8-12)
 The Monarch School in Hilshire Village, Texas (PK-12)
Monsignor Kelly Catholic High School in Beaumont, Texas (9-12)
Most Holy Trinity Catholic School in El Paso, Texas (K-8)
Mount Sacred Heart Catholic School in San Antonio, Texas (K-8)
Mount St. Michael Catholic School in Dallas, Texas (K-8)

N 
 Nazareth Academy in Victoria, Texas(K-8)
 New Braunfels Christian Academy in New Braunfels, Texas (PK-12)
 North Central Texas Academy in Granbury, Texas (K-12)
 Nolan Catholic High School in Fort Worth, Texas (9-12)
Notre Dame Catholic School in Kerrville, Texas (K-8)
 Notre Dame School of Dallas (1-postgrad)

O 
 Oak Crest Private School in Carrollton, Texas (PK-8)
 The Oakridge School in Arlington, Texas (PK-12)
O'Connell College Preparatory School in Galveston, Texas (9-12)
Our Lady of Fatima Catholic School (Galena Park) (K-8)
Our Lady of Fatima Catholic School (Texas City)  (K-8)
Our Lady of Grace Catholic School in Pleasanton, Texas (K-8)
Our Lady of Guadalupe School (Houston) (K-8)
 Our Lady of the Gulf Catholic School in Port Lavaca, Texas (K-8)
 Our Lady of the Hills High School in Kerrville, Texas (9-12)
Our Lady of Lourdes Catholic School in Hitchcock, Texas (PK-6)
Our Lady of Perpetual Help Catholic School (Dallas)  (K-8)
Our Lady of Perpetual Help Catholic School (San Antonio) (K-8)
Our Lady of Victory Catholic School (Fort Worth) (K-8)
 Our Lady of Victory Catholic School (Victoria) (K-8)
Our Lady Queen of Peace Catholic School in Richwood, Texas (K-8)
 Ovilla Christian School in Ovilla, Texas (K-12)

P 
 Parish Episcopal School in Dallas, Texas (PK-12)
 Pebblecreek Montessori School in Plano, Texas (PK-6)
 Pope John XXIII High School in Katy, Texas (9-12)
 Prestonwood Christian Academy in Plano, Texas (PK-12)
Prince of Peace Catholic School in Plano, Texas (K-8)
 Prince of Peace Christian School in Carrollton, Texas (PK-12)
 Providence High School (San Antonio) (6-12)

R 
 Radford School in El Paso, Texas (PK-12)
 Regents School of Austin in Austin, Texas (K-12)
 The Regis School of the Sacred Heart in Houston, Texas (PK-8)
 Reicher Catholic High School in Waco, Texas (PK-12)
Resurrection Catholic School in Houston, Texas (K-8)
 Rosehill Christian School in Tomball, Texas (PK-12)

S 

Sacred Heart Catholic School (Conroe) (K-8)
Sacred Heart Catholic School (Crosby) (K-8)
Sacred Heart Catholic School (Del Rio) (K-8)
Sacred Heart Catholic School (Floresville) (K-8)
 Sacred Heart Catholic School (Hallettsville, Texas) (9-12)
 Sacred Heart Catholic School (LaGrange (K-8)
Sacred Heart Catholic School (Uvalde) (K-8)
 Sacred Heart Catholic School (Muenster, Texas) (PK-12)
Saint Agnes Academy in Houston, Texas (9-12)
St. Ambrose Catholic School in Houston, Texas (K-8)
St. Andrew Catholic School in Fort Worth, Texas (K-8)
 St. Andrew's Episcopal School in Austin, Texas (K-12)
St. Anne's Catholic School (Houston (K-8)
St. Anne's Catholic School (Tomball) (K-8)
 St. Anthony Catholic High School in San Antonio, Texas (9-12)
 St. Anthony Catholic School (Columbus) (K-8)
 St. Anthony Catholic School (San Antonio) (K-8)
St. Anthony of Padua Catholic School in The Woodlands, Texas (K-8)
St. Augustine Catholic School in Houston, Texas (K-8)
 St. Austin Catholic School in Austin, Texas (K-8)
St. Bernard Catholic School in Dallas, Texas (K-8)
St. Catherine's Montessori School in Houston, Texas (PK-9)
St. Cecilia Catholic School (Dallas) (K-8)
St. Cecelia Catholic School (Hedwig Village) (K-8)
St. Christopher Catholic School in Houston, Texas (K-8)
St. Clare of Assisi Catholic School in Houston, Texas (K-8)
 St. Dominic Savio Catholic High School in Austin, Texas (9-12)
St. Edward Catholic School in Spring, Texas (K-8)
St. Elizabeth Ann Seton Catholic School (Houston) (K-8)
St. Elizabeth Ann Seton Catholic School (Keller) (K-8)
St. Elizabeth of Hungary Catholic School in Dallas, Texas (K-8)
St. Francis de Sales Catholic School in Houston, Texas (K-8)
 St. Gabriel's School in Austin, Texas (K-8)
St. George Catholic School in Fort Worth, Texas (K-8)
 St. Gerard Catholic High School in San Antonio (9-12)
St. Gregory the Great Catholic School in San Antonio, Texas (K-8)
 St. Helen Catholic School (Georgetown) (K-8)
St. Helen Catholic School (Pearland)(K-8)
 St. Ignatius Martyr Catholic School in Austin, Texas (K-8)
St. James Catholic School in Seguin, Texas (K-8)
St. James the Apostle Catholic School in San Antonio, Texas (K-8)
St. Jerome Catholic School in Houston, Texas (K-8)
 St. John's School in Houston, Texas (K-12)
St. John the Apostle Catholic School in North Richland Hills, Texas (K-8)
St. John Berchmans Catholic School in San Antonio, Texas (K-8)
St. John Bosco Catholic School in San Antonio, Texas (K-8)
 St. John's Episcopal School in Dallas, Texas (PK-8)
Saint John XXIII High School in Katy, Texas (9-12)
St. Jose Sanchez del Rio Catholic School in San Antonio, Texas (K-8)
 Saint Joseph Academy (Brownsville, Texas) (7-12)
 St. Joseph Catholic School (Bryan, Texas) (PK-12)
St. Joseph Catholic School (Arlington) (K-8)
St. Joseph Catholic School (Baytown) (PK-6)
St. Joseph Catholic School (El Paso) (K-8)
 St. Joseph Catholic School (Killeen) (K-8)
St. Joseph Catholic School (Richardson (K-8)
St. Joseph Catholic School (Waxahachie) (K-8)
 St. Joseph Catholic School (Yoakum) (K-8)
 St. Joseph High School (Victoria, Texas) (9-12)
St. Laurence Catholic School in Sugar Land, Texas (K-8)
 St. Louis Catholic School (Austin) (K-8)
St. Louis Catholic School (Castroville) (K-8)
St. Luke Catholic School in San Antonio, Texas (K-8)
St. Maria Goretti Catholic School in Arlington, Texas (K-8)
St. Mark Catholic School in Plano, Texas (K-8) 
 St. Mark's School in Dallas, Texas (1-12)
St. Martha Catholic School in Houston, Texas (K-8)
St. Martin de Porres Catholic School in Prosper, Texas (K-8)
St. Mary Catholic School (Fredericksburg) (K-8)
St. Mary Catholic School (Gainesville) (K-8)
St. Mary Catholic School (League City) (K-8)
St. Mary Catholic School (Sherman) in (K-8)
 St. Mary's Catholic School (Taylor) (K-8)
 St. Mary's Catholic School (Temple) (K-8)
 St. Mary's Catholic School (West) (K-8)
 St. Mary's Hall (San Antonio, Texas) (PK-12)
St. Mary of Carmel Catholic School in Dallas, Texas (K-8)
St. Mary Magdalene Catholic School (Humble) (K-8)
St. Mary Magdalene Catholic School (San Antonio) (K-8)
St. Mary of the Purification Catholic School in Houston, Texas (K-5)
St. Matthew Catholic School (El Paso) (K-8)
 St. Matthew Catholic School (San Antonio) (K-8)
 St. Michael's Academy in Austin, Texas (9-12)
 St. Michael Catholic School (Cuero) (K-8)
St. Michael Catholic School (Houston) (K-8)
 St. Michael Catholic School (Weimar) (K-8)
St. Monica Catholic School (Dallas) (K-8)
St. Monica Catholic School (San Antonio) (K-8)
St. Patrick Catholic School (Dallas) (K-8)
St. Patrick Catholic School (El Paso) (K-8)
St. Peter the Apostle Catholic School in Fort Worth, Texas (K-8)
St. Paul Catholic School in San Antonio, Texas (K-8)
St. Paul the Apostle Catholic School in Richardson, Texas (K-8)
St. Peter, Prince of the Apostles Catholic School in San Antonio, Texas (K-8)
Sts. Peter and Paul Catholic School in New Braunfels, Texas (K-8)
 St. Philip Catholic School in El Campo, Texas (K-8)
 St. Philip's School and Community Center in Dallas, Texas (PK-8)
St. Pius X Catholic School (Dallas) (K-8)
St. Pius X Catholic School (El Paso) (K-8)
St. Pius X Catholic School (San Antonio) (K-8)
St. Pius X High School (Houston) (9-12)
St. Raphael Catholic School in El Paso, Texas (K-8)
St. Rita Catholic School (Dallas) in Dallas, Texas (K-8)
St. Rita Catholic School (Fort Worth) in Fort Worth, Texas (K-8)
St. Rose of Lima Catholic School (Houston) (K-8)
 St. Rose of Lima Catholic School (Schulenberg) (K-8)
 St. Stephen's Episcopal School (Austin, Texas) (6-8)
St. Theresa Catholic School (Houston) (K-8)
St. Theresa Catholic School (Sugar Land) (K-8)
 St. Theresa's Catholic School in Austin, Texas (K-8)
St. Thomas Aquinas Catholic School in Dallas, Texas (K-8)
St. Thomas High School (Houston) (9-12)
St. Thomas More Catholic School (Houston) (K-8)
St. Thomas More Catholic School (San Antonio) (K-8)
St. Vincent de Paul Catholic School in Houston, Texas (K-8)
 Salam Academy (PK-12)
 San Antonio Academy (3-8)
 San Antonio Christian School (PK-12)
 San Juan Diego Catholic High School (Austin, Texas) (9-12)
 San Marcos Baptist Academy (6-12)
Santa Clara of Assisi Catholic School in Dallas, Texas (K-8)
 Santa Cruz Catholic School in Austin, Texas (K-8)
 Selwyn School in Denton, Texas (PK-12)
 Shiner Catholic School in Shiner, Texas (PK-12) (St. Lumila Elementary/St. Paul High)
 Spring Creek Academy in Plano, Texas (K-12)
 Strake Jesuit College Preparatory in Houston, Texas (9-12)

T 
 Texas School for the Deaf Austin, Texas (PK-12)
 TMI Episcopal in San Antonio, Texas (6-12)
 Trinity Christian Academy (Addison, Texas) (PK-12)
 Trinity Christian High School (Lubbock, Texas) (9-12)
 Trinity Classical School (Houston, Texas) (PK-12)
 Trinity Episcopal School of Austin (K-8)
 Trinity Preparatory Academy in Watauga, Texas (K-12)
 Trinity School of Texas in Longview, Texas (PK-12)
 Trinity Valley School in Fort Worth, Texas (PK-12)
True Cross Catholic School in Dickinson, Texas (K-8)

U 
 Ursuline Academy of Dallas in Dallas, Texas (9-12)

V 
 Veritas Academy (Austin, Texas) (PK-12)
 Vanguard College Preparatory School in Waco, Texas (7-12)

W 
 Westbury Christian School in Houston, TX (PK-12)
 The Winston School in Dallas, Texas (K-12)

Z 
 Zion Lutheran School in Georgetown, Texas

See also 
 List of school districts in Texas
 List of high schools in Texas
 Southwest Preparatory Conference

References

Private